William Shepard ( – , 1817) was a United States representative from Massachusetts (1797–1802), and a military officer in the Continental Army during the American Revolutionary War. As a state militia leader he protected the Springfield Armory during Shays' Rebellion, firing cannon into the force of Daniel Shays and compelling them to disperse. He was also served in town and state government and was a member of the Massachusetts Governor's Council.

Life
Born in Westfield in the Province of Massachusetts Bay, he attended the common schools, engaged in agricultural pursuits, and served in the French and Indian wars for six years. He was a member of the committee of correspondence for Westfield in 1774, and was a lieutenant colonel of Minutemen in April 1775 and served under Colonel Timothy Danielson. He entered the Continental Army in May 1775 as lieutenant colonel and was commissioned Colonel of the 4th Massachusetts Regiment on October 6, 1776, serving throughout the Revolutionary War, including winter at Valley Forge, Pennsylvania, where he commanded the 4th Regiment of Massachusetts Continentals, under the overall command of General John Glover. His name is immortalized along with his comrades on stone monuments there. Many letters still exist between Shepard and other commanders, including General George Washington, the Marquis de Lafayette, John Hancock, Samuel Adams, Thomas Jefferson, General Henry Knox and other illustrious founding fathers.

Shepard was a member of the Massachusetts House of Representatives in 1785 and 1786 and was selectman for Westfield from 1784 to 1787.  In this time local farmers and veterans of the war began to rebel after months of destitution and taxation they believed to be unfairly levied by the powers from Boston. Many were consigned to debtors' prison. Shepard, then a major general in the state militia, called to duty the Fourth Division of the Massachusetts militia in 1786 and defended the Springfield Armory during what became known as Shays' Rebellion (after one of its principal leaders, Daniel Shays), ordering defenders of the arsenal to fire cannons at attacking the rebels at "waist height" with cannons filled with anti-personnel grape shot. Two of the insurgents were mortally wounded. Messages to Governor James Bowdoin express his deep regret at the shedding of blood. He kept in constant contact with Governor Bowdoin, Sam Adams, John Hancock, and General Benjamin Lincoln, who arrived in a blizzard from Boston just after the Springfield arsenal attack to pursue Shays and his men into the surrounding towns.  That order would earn Shepard a lasting reputation as the "murderer of brethren." The local neighbors were so angry that they mutilated his horses, gouging out their eyes, to his horror.  He was a member of the Governor's council of Massachusetts from 1792 to 1796, and was appointed in 1796 to treat with the Penobscot Indians and, in 1797, with the Six Nations.
Shepard was elected as a Federalist to the Fifth, Sixth, and Seventh Congresses, serving from March 4, 1797, to March 3, 1803; he resumed his agricultural pursuits and died in Westfield, essentially penniless. Interment was in the Mechanic Street Cemetery. A statue of him stands in Westfield, sculpted by Augustus Lukeman. Each year on Patriots' Day, a ceremony is held in Westfield, wherein his descendants and those of four other founding families of Westfield join  city and state government representatives, members of the armed forces, clergy, local school children and residents in giving prayer and remembrance of the town's history.
From a mid-western paper c.1928 he was reported to have been quoted as saying, "Hang On! If the motherhood of America ever lets go, it will serve us right if America turns to the saloon or its equivalent. But the motherhood of America will not let go."

Notes

References

Bibliography

"A Little Rebellion" by Marion L. Starkey c.1995, Pub.by Alfred A.Knopf, L.o.C. cat # 55-9292

Massachusetts, Office of the Secretary of State. (1906) Massachusetts soldiers and sailors of the revolutionary war. A compilation from the archives prepared and published by the secretary of the commonwealth in accordance with chapter 100, resolves of 1891. Boston: Wright and Potter Printing Co., State Printers.

External links 
 General William Shepard Collection at the Westfield Athenaeum
 Letters to Militia General William Shepard at icollector.com
 A sermon, delivered at Westfield, November 18th, 1817; at the funeral of Maj. Gen. William Shepard, aged eighty at the Internet Archive
 Shays' Rebellion - Person: William Shepard at Springfield Technical Community College
 General Shepard Park at Westfield, Massachusetts
 Statue of Major General William Shepard in The History of the Celebration of the Two Hundred and Fiftieth Anniversary of the Incorporation of the Town of Westfield Massachusetts
 Shepard genealogy in Genealogical and Family History of Western New York: A Record of the Achievements of Her People in the Making of a Commonwealth and the Building of a Nation, Volume 2

1737 births
1817 deaths
American militia generals
Continental Army officers from Massachusetts
People of Massachusetts in the French and Indian War
People from Westfield, Massachusetts
Members of the Massachusetts House of Representatives
Members of the Massachusetts Governor's Council
Federalist Party members of the United States House of Representatives from Massachusetts